Hollywood Casino Corp. was a gaming company based in Dallas, Texas. It was acquired in 2003 by Penn National Gaming for $328 million plus $360 million in assumed debt.

In the early 1990s, as legalized gambling spread to new states, the Pratts, owners of Sands Atlantic City, established Hollywood Casino Corp. to develop new casinos under the Hollywood Casino name. At the time of its initial public offering in 1993, HWCC owned an 80 percent stake in Pratt Hotel.

The company made its initial public offering in May 1993. Its first riverboat casino opened in Aurora, Illinois the next month. In January 1994, Hollywood acquired a casino being built in Tunica County, Mississippi from Summit Casinos for $15 million, and it opened in August. A casino in Shreveport, Louisiana was opened in December 2000.

List of properties
 Hollywood Casino Aurora – Aurora, Illinois
 Hollywood Casino Shreveport – Shreveport, Louisiana
 Hollywood Casino Tunica – Tunica Resorts, Mississippi
 Sands Atlantic City – Atlantic City, New Jersey (80 percent ownership through Pratt Hotel Corp.)

References

Defunct gambling companies
Gambling companies of the United States
Gambling companies established in 1993
Gambling companies disestablished in 2003